Procambarus lucifugus, the Florida cave crayfish, vampire crayfish, or light-fleeing cave crayfish, is a troglomorphic freshwater crayfish endemic to 20-25 occurrences (likely more) in an arc of caves 80 km long in 6 Florida counties. 

There are two sub-species described;
Procambarus lucifugus lucifugus
Procambarus lucifugus alachua
The two sub-species are known to form intergrades in the range where they overlap.

References

Cambaridae
Cave crayfish
Freshwater crustaceans of North America
Crustaceans described in 1940
Endemic fauna of Florida
Taxa named by Horton H. Hobbs Jr.